The rostral organ of the coelacanth or similar in many other fish such as Anchovy is a large gel-filled cavity in the snout, with three pairs of canals to the outside.

It is surrounded by an insulating layer of adipose tissue and innervated by the superficial ophthalmic nerve.  Its anatomy and innervation suggest it is an electroreceptive organ used for finding prey in the dark.  This is supported by experiments which showed that coelacanths react to electrical fields produced by a submersible.

References

Sensory organs in animals
Fish anatomy